Šurmanci is a village in Bosnia and Herzegovina. According to the 1991 census, the village is located in the municipality of Čapljina.

History and people
Šurmanci is the location of Golubinka cave, where Ustashas killed more than 500 Serb civilians from village of Prebilovci in 1941.

Ivan Jovanović, war criminal, sentenced to death and executed in 1958.
Ludvig Jovanović, war criminal.

Demographics 
According to the 2013 census, its population was 301.

References

Villages in the Federation of Bosnia and Herzegovina
Populated places in Čapljina